Shakespeare is a ghost town in Hidalgo County, New Mexico, United States. It is currently part of a privately owned ranch, sometimes open to tourists. The entire community was listed on the National Register of Historic Places in 1973.

History

Founded as a rest stop called Mexican Springs along a stagecoach route, it was renamed Grant after the Civil War, after General U. S. Grant. When silver was discovered nearby it became a mining town called Ralston City, named after financier William Chapman Ralston. It was finally renamed Shakespeare, and was abandoned when the mines closed in 1929.

On November 9, 1881, Old West outlaws "Russian Bill" Tattenbaum and Sandy King, both cattle rustlers and former members of the Clanton faction of Charleston, Arizona Territory, were lynched in Shakespeare, and their bodies were left hanging for several days as a reminder to others that lawlessness would not be tolerated. The two had been captured by gunman "Dangerous Dan" Tucker, who at the time was the Shakespeare town marshal.

See also

 List of ghost towns in New Mexico
 National Register of Historic Places listings in Hidalgo County, New Mexico

References

External links

 GhostTowns.com page
 Shakespeare website

Ghost towns in New Mexico
Geography of Hidalgo County, New Mexico
History of Hidalgo County, New Mexico
Historic districts on the National Register of Historic Places in New Mexico
National Register of Historic Places in Hidalgo County, New Mexico
Populated places on the National Register of Historic Places in New Mexico